State Route 262 (SR-262) is a  state highway completely within San Juan County in southeastern Utah. SR-262 connects U.S. Route 191 (US-191) north of Bluff to SR-162 in Montezuma Creek.

Route description

After its western terminus at US-191, SR-262 generally heads east until Indian Route 5099, where it turns south-southwest. Afterwards, the route turns east and then south for one last time before reaching the eastern terminus at SR-162 in Montezuma Creek.

History

The State Road Commission created SR-262 in 1958, running from SR-47 (now US-191) north of Bluff east and south for 20.0 miles (32.2 km) to a point in the Aneth Oil Field about a mile (1.5 km) beyond the bridge over Montezuma Creek, near the curve to the south-southwest. In 1961, the route was extended to just beyond its present end in the settlement of Montezuma Creek, where the road to Aneth (now SR-162) turns east, and in 1965 it was extended further to the Colorado state line, connecting to SH 41 across the border. A road from Montezuma Creek west to US-191 at Bluff was added to the state highway system in 1986 as SR-163. At the time, Utah was considering making the road part of an extension of US-163 into Colorado, but plans fell through, leaving an overlap with US-191 and Route 163 near Bluff that became US-163 to the west and SR-163 to the east. To fix this issue, SR-163 was renumbered SR-162 in 2004, and the part of SR-262 east of Montezuma Creek also became SR-162.

Major intersections

See also

 List of state highways in Utah

References

External links

262
262
 262